Kall or KALL may refer to:

Places
 Kall, North Rhine-Westphalia, a municipality in North Rhine-Westphalia, Germany
 Kall, Sweden, a parish in the Åre Municipality in the county of Jämtland, Sweden
 Kall (Rur), a river in North Rhine-Westphalia, Germany
 Kallbach ("Kall stream"), a stream in North Rhine-Westphalia, Germany

In communications
 KALL, an all-sports radio station in the Salt Lake City, Utah area
 KWDZ, a defunct radio station (910 AM) formerly licensed to serve Salt Lake City, Utah, formerly broadcasting under the call sign KALL
 Hey, a Faroese telecommunications company formerly known as Kall

People
 Friedrich von Kall (1742–1809), Prussian major general
 Georg Friedrich von Kall (1781–1813), Prussian major and regimental commanding officer
 Martin Kall (b 1961), German manager, formerly the chairman of Tamedia

Other uses
 Kal-L, a superhero in comic books published by DC Comics

See also

 Call (disambiguation)
 Kal (disambiguation)
Kalla (disambiguation)
Kallu (name)